The 2021–22 season was the 144th in the history of Wolverhampton Wanderers and the 4th consecutive in the Premier League. The club also competed in the FA Cup and the EFL Cup.

This is the first season under former Benfica manager Bruno Lage, who was appointed on 9 June 2021 following the departure of Nuno Espírito Santo by mutual consent at the end of the previous season.

Pre-season friendlies
The culb's pre-season schedule included friendlies against Crewe Alexandra, Real Betis, Stoke City, Coventry City and Celta Vigo, in addition to two friendlies behind closed doors against Forest Green Rovers and Al Shabab. On July 12, Wanderers confirmed a sixth pre-season match, against Las Palmas.

Competitions

Premier League

League table

Results summary

Results by matchday

Matches
The provisional fixture list was released on 16 June 2021, but was subject to change in the event of matches being selected for television coverage or police concerns.

FA Cup

As a Premier League team, Wolves entered the competition at the third round stage, and were drawn at home to Sheffield United.

EFL Cup

As a Premier League team not involved in European competition, Wolves entered the competition at the second round stage in August 2021 and were drawn away to Nottingham Forest and in the third round against Tottenham Hotspur at home.

EFL Trophy

Wolves were one of the sixteen teams from outside the bottom two divisions of the Football League to be invited to field their academy team in the competition due to it holding Category 1 academy status. They were drawn into Group C in the Northern section. Note: In group stage matches which were level at the end of 90 minutes, a penalty shoot-out was held, with the winner earning a bonus point.

Players

Statistics

|-
|align="left"|||align="left"|||align="left"| 
|||0||||0||0||0||style="background:#98FB98"|||0||3||0||
|-
|align="left"|||align="left"|||align="left"|  
|||0||||0||||0||||0||1||0||
|-
|align="left"|||align="left"|||align="left"|  
|||1||||0||||0||||1||4||0||
|-
|align="left"|||align="left"|||align="left"|  
|||0||||0||0||0||||0||3||0||
|-
|align="left"|||align="left"|||align="left"|  ¤
|||0||||0||0||0||||0||0||0||
|-
|align="left"|||align="left"|||align="left"| 
|||1||||0||0||0||||1||3||0||
|-
|align="left"|||align="left"|||align="left"|  
|||4||||0||1||0||||4||11||0||
|-
|align="left"|||align="left"|||align="left"| 
|||6||||0||0||0||||6||6||2||
|-
|align="left"|10||align="left"|||align="left"|  
|||2||||2||||2||||6||2||0||
|-
|align="left"|11||align="left"|||style="background:#faecc8; text-align:left;"|  ‡ 
|||2||||0||||1||||3||0||0||
|-
|align="left"|13||align="left"|||align="left"|  ¤
|||0||||0||||0||||0||0||0||
|-
|align="left"|14||align="left"|||align="left"|  
|||0||||0||1||0||style="background:#98FB98"|||0||0||0||
|-
|align="left"|15||align="left"|||align="left"|  
|||0||||0||1||0||||0||1||0||
|-
|align="left"|16||align="left"|||align="left"| 
|||4||||0||||0||||4||4||0||
|-
|align="left"|17||align="left"|||align="left"| 
|||0||||0||||0||||0||1||0||
|-
|align="left"|18||align="left"|||align="left"|  ¤
|||0||||0||||1||||1||1||0||
|-
|align="left"|19||align="left"|||align="left"|  
|||2||||0||0||0||||2||1||0||
|-
|align="left"|20||align="left"|||align="left"| 
|||0||||0||0||0||style="background:#98FB98"|||0||0||0||
|-
|align="left"|21||align="left"|||align="left"| 
|||0||||0||||0||||0||0||0||
|-
|align="left"|22||align="left"|||align="left"|  
|||0||||1||||0||||1||1||0||
|-
|align="left"|23||align="left"|||align="left"|  
|||1||||0|||||0||||1||3||0||
|-
|align="left"|24||align="left"|||align="left"|  ¤
|||0||||0||0||0||style="background:#98FB98"|||0||1||0||
|-
|align="left"|26||align="left"|||style="background:#faecc8; text-align:left;"|  ‡ 
|||5||||0||||0||style="background:#98FB98"|||5||2||0||
|-
|align="left"|27||align="left"|||align="left"| 
|||2||||0||||1||||3||6||0||
|-
|align="left"|28||align="left"|||align="left"| 
|||2||||0||||0||||2||4||0||
|-
|align="left"|32||align="left"|||align="left"| 
|||2||||0||||1||||3||4||0||
|-
|align="left"|33||align="left"|||align="left"|  ¤
|||0||||0||0||0||||0||0||0||
|-
|align="left"|34||align="left"|||align="left"|  ¤
|||0||||0||0||0||||0||0||0||
|-
|align="left"|37||align="left"|||align="left"|  ¤
|||1||||0||||0||||1||0||0||
|-
|align="left"|39||align="left"|||align="left"| 
|||0||||0||||0||||0||0||0||
|-
|align="left"|40||align="left"|||align="left"|  ¤
|||0||||0||0||0||||0||0||0||
|-
|align="left"|48||align="left"|||align="left"| 
|||0||||0||0||0||||0||0||0||
|-
|align="left"|54||align="left"|||align="left"|  †
|||0||||0||0||0||||0||0||0||
|-
|align="left"|59||align="left"|||align="left"|  †
|||0||||0||0||0||||0||0||0||
|-
|align="left"|62||align="left"|||align="left"|  ¤
|||0||||0||0||0||||0||0||0||
|-
|align="left"|64||align="left"|||align="left"| 
|||0||||0||0||0||||0||0||0||
|-
|align="left"|75||align="left"|||align="left"|  ¤
|||0||||0||0||0||||0||0||0||
|-
|align="left"|77||align="left"|||align="left"| 
|||0||||0||0||0||||0||0||0||
|-
|align="left"|81||align="left"|||align="left"| 
|||0||||0||0||0||||0||0||0||
|-
|}

Transfers

Transfers in

Loans in

New and extended contracts

Loans out

Transfers out

See also
 2021–22 in English football
 List of Wolverhampton Wanderers F.C. seasons

References

Wolverhampton Wanderers
Wolverhampton Wanderers F.C. seasons